The Hanging Order is a telegram from Bolshevik leader Vladimir Lenin ordering the suppression and execution of captured participants in the kulak revolt in the Penza Governorate. It was first called the "Hanging Order" by the U.S. Library of Congress. The telegram was addressed to Penza Communists Vasily Kurayev (Penza Soviet chairman), Yevgenia Bosch (the chairwoman of Penza Governorate Party Committee) and Alexander Minkin (the chairman of Penza ispolkom) and dated 11 August 1918.


Historical background
During the summer of 1918, many of Russia's central cities, including Moscow and Petrograd, were cut off from the grain-producing regions of Ukraine, northern Caucasus, and Siberia by the civil war. As a result, hundreds of thousands of people were on the brink of starvation. The Penza Governorate was critical in providing food to the cities and the government used effective measures, such as prodrazvyorstka (forcible requisitioning), to collect grain from the kulaks. The Central Committee sent Yevgenia Bosch to supervise grain collection.

A peasant revolt erupted in the Kuchkino Volost of Penzensky Uyezd on 5 August 1918, in opposition to requisitioning, and soon spread to neighbouring regions. While Penza Soviet chairman Kurayev opposed the use of military force and argued that propaganda efforts would be sufficient, Bosch insisted on using the military and mass executions. By 8 August 1918, Soviet forces had crushed the revolt, but the situation in the governorate remained tense, and a revolt led by members of Socialist Revolutionary Party erupted in the town of Chembar on 18 August. Lenin sent several telegrams to Penza demanding harsher measures in fighting these kulak, kulak-supporting peasants and Left SR insurrectionists.

11 August 1918 cable
One telegram (dated 11 August 1918) instructed the Communists operating in the Penza area to publicly hang at least one hundred kulaks, to publicize their names, to confiscate their grain, and to designate a number of hostages. Whether anyone was actually hanged according to this order remains unknown. 
Lenin's so-called "Hanging Order" was discussed during a controversy about the BBC documentary Lenin's Secret Files (1997) based upon Robert Service's findings in Soviet archives. 

This is a translation of the Russian original:

"Comrades! The insurrection of five kulak districts should be pitilessly suppressed. The interests of the whole revolution require this because 'the last decisive battle' with the kulaks is now underway everywhere. An example must be made.

Hang (absolutely hang, in full view of the people) no fewer than one hundred known kulaks, fatcats, bloodsuckers.
Publish their names.
Seize all grain from them.
Designate hostages - in accordance with yesterday's telegram.
Do it in such a fashion, that for hundreds of verst around the people see, tremble, know, shout: "the bloodsucking kulaks are being strangled and will be strangled".

Telegraph receipt and implementation.  Yours, Lenin.

P.S. Find tougher people."

19 August 1918 cable
On 19 August 1918, Lenin sent another telegram to Penza expressing exasperation and modifying his previous instructions:

I am extremely indignant that there has been absolutely nothing definite from you as to what serious measures have at last been carried out by you for ruthless suppression of the kulaks of five volosts and confiscation of their grain. Your inactivity is criminal. All efforts should be concentrated on a single volost which should be swept clean of all grain surpluses. Telegraph fulfilment.

Lenin
Chairman, Council of People's Commissars

See also
 Mass killings under communist regimes

Footnotes

References
http://alphahistory.com/russianrevolution/lenins-hanging-order-kulaks-1918/

Documents of the Soviet Union
Works by Vladimir Lenin
Russian Civil War
1918 documents